Audrey Gordon is a Canadian politician and member of the Legislative Assembly of Manitoba, representing the electoral district of Southdale as a member of the Progressive Conservative Party of Manitoba. Alongside Jamie Moses and Uzoma Asagwara, she was one of the first three Black Canadian MLAs elected in the 2019 Manitoba general election.

Political career
At the 2016 general election, Gordon stood in the central Winnipeg constituency of Fort Rouge. She came in second place to Wab Kinew, who later became leader of the Manitoba NDP, narrowing the NDP majority in the district; Manitoba Liberal Party leader Rana Bokhari, who did not have a seat at the time of the election, ran third in this riding.

At the 2019 general election, Gordon was elected in the southeastern Winnipeg constituency of Southdale.

In August 2020, Gordon was victim of a racist attack when a bench with her image on it was defaced with graffiti.

In May 2021 Springs Church, of which Gordon is a member, held an in-person graduation event. This was apparently in defiance of restrictions meant to curb the spread of COVID-19. Gordon eventually condemned the event in a Facebook post, adding: "I have read several posts stating that I was present at the Springs graduation ceremony. To my knowledge, no evidence has been provided to substantiate this claim."  Her Facebook page was later deactivated.

In November 2021, Gordon was criticized for offering "thoughts and prayers" to Manitobans who had their surgeries cancelled and placed on a waitlist of over 130,000 postponed procedures. As of December 7, the delayed procedure backlog has surpassed 152,000 and on December 8 health officials announced that they would look at cancelling additional surgical procedures as ICU beds are required for new COVID-19 patients that are being admitted to hospitals.

Electoral record

References

External links
 Audrey Gordon on Twitter

Living people
Politicians from Winnipeg
Progressive Conservative Party of Manitoba MLAs
Black Canadian politicians
Black Canadian women
Members of the Executive Council of Manitoba
Women government ministers of Canada
Health ministers of Manitoba
21st-century Canadian politicians
Year of birth missing (living people)